Revati is the Hindu name for Zeta Piscium, a star on the edge of the  Pisces zodiac constellation. In Hindu sidereal astronomy this star is identified as the First Point of Aries, i.e. when the Sun crosses this star, a new solar year begins.
Ashwini is the first star in Aries constellation, which is the first zodiacal sign.

Astrology
Revati  (Devanagari: रेवती) is the twenty-seventh nakshatra in Hindu astrology (or the 28th, if Abhijit is counted) corresponding to ζ Piscium.
It is ruled by Puṣan, one of the 12 Ādityas. According to the beliefs of traditional electional astrology, Revati is a sweet or delicate nakshatra, meaning that while Revati has the most influence, it is best to begin working on things of physical beauty like music and jewellery .

Revati is symbolized by fish (often a pair of fish). It is also associated with the sea.

Traditional Hindu given names are determined by which pada (quarter) of a nakshatra the Moon was in, at the time of birth. In the case of Revati, the given name would begin with the following syllables:
De (दे)
Do (दो)
Cha (च)
Chi (ची)

Revati is seen as a nakshatra that nurtures and fosters wealth, expansion, and vigour. Revati is great for beginning a new trip, marriage rituals, childbirth, or shopping for new clothing. Fish are used to represent the nakshatra and symbolize learning and movement.

Revati Nakshatra Born Personality Traits
Revati Nakshatra natives typically have good, balanced bodies and are tall. They are believed to have a charming personality and a fair skin tone. This Nakshatra's inhabitants have pure hearts and are able to respond appropriately in various circumstances. They have high educational aspirations and a constant desire to learn more. When given a task to complete for an extended amount of time, people become disinterested and lose focus. At that point, they want to take a different action. These peoples physical issues cause them to continue to feel anxious. Individuals born under the influence of this planet do not readily trust others, but once they do, they completely believe them completely. They value harmony, thus they honor the society and its customs. They complete any assignment in a systematic way. They respond to events maturely and sensitively. Revati Nakshatra is regarded as lucky and auspicious. This sign's natives are exceedingly dependable. The person born under this nakshatra is capable of maintaining composure under pressure. He or she is naturally quite sensible and always willing to lend a helping hand. He or she is very sensitive and gentle by nature. People like them because of their polite demeanour. They may show a lot of self-confidence in their talents and abilities. They occasionally don't respond appropriately to circumstances. To succeed, they must put up a lot of effort in their life. It has frequently been observed that those born under this sign continue to waste their skills in the wrong fields. These people are recommended to keep a close eye on their spending.

Revati Nakshatra Born Health
Guru and Budh are the rulers of this nakshatra and are in charge of the fingers and toes. In addition to these, this planet also regulates illnesses of the thighs, knees, and digestive system. The natives might have a disease affecting these body parts as a result of the effects of this planet. The people born under the influence of this planet frequently complain of a cough, which makes them particularly vulnerable to climate change.

Revati Nakshatra Born Family
Revati Nakshatra people are very close to their family, however they are unable to articulate their feelings. These people are seen to reside distant from where they were born. Their close friends and family are not very helpful to them. Also, he or she is unable to get enough help from his father. Disputeful environment might arise in familial life. On minor issues, their viewpoints might diverge from other family members. They do not get along well with their relatives for all of the mentioned reasons. Yet, they lead normal married lives. A loving and equal attitude is displayed by a life partner.

Revati Nakshatra Born Business
Those born under the Revati Nakshatra sign are fascinated by historical discoveries, scientific study, and primitive culture. It is obvious that if they choose to work in these industries, it will be advantageous for them. They also enjoy astrological-related work. Medical courses are another excellent choice for them. They can succeed only because of their diligence. In addition to this, they can achieve success in the humanities.

These people are somewhat interested in work related to orphanages, religious communities, security, motor vehicle training, commute, etc. They are also somewhat interested in acting, singing, dancing, linguistics, magic, railroads and roads, civil engineering, architecture, writer, air hostess, gem dealer, and drawing and painting.

Remedy
It is advised that the natives of Revati Nakshatra to worship Lord Vishnu. It is good for them to chant and listen to all of the names of Vishnu. The mantra "Om La, Om Shang, Om Ang" should be chanted while Chandrama (Moon) is moving through Revati Nakshatra. By doing this, he can improve his life and achieve success. Also, for some folks, dressing in bright blue, green, or blended colours can be beneficial.

Revati Nakshatra As Per Padas
First Pada of Revati Nakshatra: Jupiter is the ruling planet of Sagittarius, the first pada of Revati Nakshatra. The locals emphasise being friendly and helpful here. These people will be really positive.

Second Pada of Revati Nakshatra: Saturn is the ruler of Capricorn in the second pada of Revati Nakshatra. Here, the native's emphasis is on being orderly, following the tried-and-true way, and avoiding taking any risks.

Third Pada of Revati Nakshatra: Saturn is the ruler of the Aquarius Navamsa, which includes the third pada of Revati Nakshatra. Here, the emphasis is on showing empathy for others' suffering and making every effort to assist them.

Revati Nakshatra Fourth Pada: The Jupiter-ruled Pisces Navamsa is where the fourth pada of the Revati Nakshatra falls. The locals are prone to daydreaming and erecting imaginary fortresses in the sky. The natives are also vulnerable to outside influences.

References

Nakshatra